"Culture Flash" is a song and single by music project of Members of Mayday. The unofficial anthem of Mayday Festival, one of the oldest and most reputed electronic music festivals in Europe.

Versions

Official
 "Culture Flash" (Original)
 "Culture Flash" (Original Extended Mix) - 9:24
 "Culture Flash" (Raw Power Mix) - 5:31
 "Culture Flash" (Drumappella) - 1:35
 "Culture Flash" (Hardy Hard Mix) - 6:58
 "Culture Flash" (Short) - 3:03

Unofficial
 "Culture Flash" (G-Kingu, short mix 2010) - 3:36
 and some other

References

External links
 
  on Viva

2002 singles
Eurodance songs
2002 songs